Ariel poems can refer to:

 Ariel poems (Eliot), by T. S. Eliot
 Ariel poems (Faber), pamphlets published by Faber and Gwyer

See also
 Ariel (book), poems by Sylvia Plath